Saint-Valérien-de-Milton is a municipality in the Canadian province of Quebec, located within Les Maskoutains Regional County Municipality. The population as of the Canada 2011 Census was 1,840.

Demographics

Population

Language

See also
List of municipalities in Quebec

References

Municipalities in Quebec
Incorporated places in Les Maskoutains Regional County Municipality